Christene Jackson Brownlee (born October 16, 1955) is an American politician. She was formerly the mayor of Gilmore, Arkansas and a former state legislator in Arkansas. A member of the Republican Party, she served in the Arkansas House of Representatives from 1991 to 1994.

References

1955 births
Living people
Members of the Arkansas House of Representatives
20th-century American politicians
20th-century American women politicians
21st-century American women